The chemical substance 1,2-dioxetane  (systematically named 1,2-dioxacyclobutane, also known as ethylene peroxide or peroxyethane) is a heterocyclic, organic compound with formula , containing a ring of two adjacent oxygen atoms and two adjacent carbon atoms.  It is therefore an organic peroxide, and can be viewed as a dimer of formaldehyde.

Luminescence 
In the 1960s, biochemists discovered that some derivatives of 1,2-dioxetane have a fleeting existence as intermediates in the reactions responsible for the bioluminescence in fireflies, glow-worms and other luminescent creatures. The luminescence of glowsticks and luminescent bangles and necklaces involves 1,2-dioxetanedione (CO), another dioxetane derivative that decomposes to carbon dioxide. Other dioxetane derivatives are used in clinical analysis, where their light emission (which can be measured even at very low levels) allows chemists to detect very low concentrations of body fluid constituents.

Derivatives 
The hypothesis could not be proved because these four-membered cyclic peroxides are quite unstable. Then in 1968 the first example of a stable dioxetane derivative was made at the University of Alberta in Edmonton: 3,3,4-trimethyl-1,2-dioxetane, prepared as a yellow solution in benzene. When heated to 333 K, it decomposed smoothly (rather than explosively, as many peroxides do) to acetone and acetaldehyde with the emission of pale blue light.

The second example of a dioxetane derivative was made shortly after: the symmetrical compound 3,3,4,4-tetramethyl-1,2-dioxetane, obtained as pale yellow crystals that sublimed even when kept in the refrigerator. Benzene solutions of this compound also decomposed smoothly with the emission of blue light. By adding compounds that normally fluoresce in UV light the colour of the emitted light could be altered.

Carbon monoxide 
The dioxetane intermediate is capable of generating carbon monoxide and has been explored as a carbon monoxide pro-drug.

 Peroxidation of heme at the alpha-methine bridge generates carbon monoxide and forms biliverdin as a non-enzymatic alternative pathway to heme oxygenase
 Lipid peroxidation

Peroxidation of the reactive enol of alpha keto acids, such as the tautomer of phenylpyruvic acid at the benzylic carbon, can form a fluorescing 1,2-dioxetane to generate benzaldehyde and oxalic acid. Alternatively, a peroxylactone can form (alpha-keto-beta-peroxylactone) which also forms benzaldehyde but liberates carbon dioxide and carbon monoxide.

See also 
 1,3-Dioxetane

References

Organic peroxides
Dioxetanes